James Dean: The First American Teenager was a 1976 American documentary film about actor James Dean featuring interviews with many of Dean's friends and co-stars.

The film was produced by ZIV International and distributed by Walt Disney Studios Motion Pictures.

References

External links

1976 films
American television films
Documentary films about actors
James Dean
Films distributed by Disney
1970s English-language films